Thomas Barker (25 March 1799 – 12 March 1875) was an Australian politician and an appointed member of the New South Wales Legislative Council between 1853 and 1856. He was also an elected member of the New South Wales Legislative Assembly for 1 term from  1856 until 1858.

Early life
Barker was born in London. He was the son of James Barker (who died in 1808) and he was then raised by a guardian. He was educated at home and apprenticed to an engineer, John Dickson . Barker accompanied Dickson when he migrated to Australia in 1813 and with Dickson and his brother, James Barker, he constructed and built a number of steam driven flour mills. He made a substantial fortune in the flour milling business and also constructed cotton and woolen mills. He invested in land in the Goulburn Plains district and also invested in the Commercial Banking Company of Sydney and infrastructure projects including the Sydney Railway Company. He was an early benefactor to Sydney Grammar School and the University of Sydney.

Colonial Parliament
Barker was an appointed member of the Legislative Council between 1853 and 1856, prior to the establishment of responsible government. At the 1856 election, the first after the granting of responsible government and creation of the Legislative Assembly, he was elected for the seat of Gloucester and Macquarie with 163 votes (37.73&). He served without distinction in the first responsible parliament and was defeated at the 1858 election with 275 votes (39.29%). He did not stand for further public office.

References

 

1799 births
1875 deaths
Members of the New South Wales Legislative Assembly
Members of the New South Wales Legislative Council
19th-century Australian politicians